Charles C. Lanham (September 12, 1928 – December 15, 2015) was an American businessman and politician.

Born in Ripley, West Virginia, Lanham graduated from Ripley High School in 1946. He then served in the United States Army. In 1952, Lanham graduated from Marshall University. Lanham worked in the bank business in Ripley, West Virginia and then in Point Pleasant, West Virginia. Lanham, a Republican, was appointed to the West Virginia Senate's 4th district in 2004 by then-Governor Bob Wise to fill the vacancy left by Lisa Smith, who stepped down due to health reasons. He declined to run in 2006 when his term expired. While in office, Lanham served on several committees, including Banking and Insurance, Economic Development, Government Organization, the Judiciary and Labor and Pensions. He died at Point Pleasant, West Virginia.

Notes

1928 births
2015 deaths
People from Ripley, West Virginia
People from Point Pleasant, West Virginia
Marshall University alumni
Businesspeople from West Virginia
Republican Party West Virginia state senators
21st-century American politicians
20th-century American businesspeople